Madagascar competed at the 2008 Summer Olympics in Beijing, People's Republic of China. The country sent six representatives to compete in four sports.

Athletics

Men

Women

Key
Note–Ranks given for track events are within the athlete's heat only
Q = Qualified for the next round
q = Qualified for the next round as a fastest loser or, in field events, by position without achieving the qualifying target
NR = National record
N/A = Round not applicable for the event
Bye = Athlete not required to compete in round

Boxing

In March 2008 in Windhoek, Namibia, Jean de Dieu Soloniaina Razanadrakoto qualified for the 2008 games in the lightweight division by winning a gold medal.

Judo

Swimming 

Men

Women

See also
 Madagascar at the 2008 Summer Paralympics

References

Nations at the 2008 Summer Olympics
2008
Olympics